The meridian 63° east of Greenwich is a line of longitude that extends from the North Pole across the Arctic Ocean, Europe, Asia, the Indian Ocean, the Southern Ocean, and Antarctica to the South Pole.

The 63rd meridian east forms a great circle with the 117th meridian west.

From Pole to Pole
Starting at the North Pole and heading south to the South Pole, the 63rd meridian east passes through:

{| class="wikitable plainrowheaders"
! scope="col" width="115" | Co-ordinates
! scope="col" | Country, territory or sea
! scope="col" | Notes
|-
| style="background:#b0e0e6;" | 
! scope="row" style="background:#b0e0e6;" | Arctic Ocean
| style="background:#b0e0e6;" |
|-
| 
! scope="row" | 
| Eva Island, Franz Josef Land, Arkhangelsk Oblast
|-
| style="background:#b0e0e6;" | 
! scope="row" style="background:#b0e0e6;" | Arctic Ocean
| style="background:#b0e0e6;" |
|-
| 
! scope="row" | 
| Graham Bell Island, Franz Josef Land, Arkhangelsk Oblast
|-
| style="background:#b0e0e6;" | 
! scope="row" style="background:#b0e0e6;" | Barents Sea
| style="background:#b0e0e6;" |
|-
| 
! scope="row" | 
| Severny Island, Novaya Zemlya, Arkhangelsk Oblast
|-
| style="background:#b0e0e6;" | 
! scope="row" style="background:#b0e0e6;" | Kara Sea
| style="background:#b0e0e6;" |
|-
| 
! scope="row" | 
| Nenetsia, Komi, Khantia-Mansia, Sverdlovsk Ob., Kurgan Ob., Chelyabinsk Ob.
|-
| 
! scope="row" | 
| Kostanay Reg., Aktobe Reg., Qaraghandy Reg., Qyzylorda Reg.
|-
| 
! scope="row" | 
| Navoiy Region, Bukhara Region
|-
| 
! scope="row" | 
| Lebap Region, Mary Region
|-
| 
! scope="row" | 
| Badghis, Herat, Farah, Nimruz, Helmand
|-
| 
! scope="row" | 
| Balochistan
|-
| 
! scope="row" | 
| Sistan-va-Baluchestan
|-
| 
! scope="row" | 
| Balochistan
|-
| style="background:#b0e0e6;" | 
! scope="row" style="background:#b0e0e6;" | Indian Ocean
| style="background:#b0e0e6;" | Passing west of the island of Rodrigues, 
|-
| style="background:#b0e0e6;" | 
! scope="row" style="background:#b0e0e6;" | Southern Ocean
| style="background:#b0e0e6;" |
|-
| 
! scope="row" | Antarctica
| Australian Antarctic Territory, claimed by 
|-
|}

See also
62nd meridian east
64th meridian east

e063 meridian east